The 1979–80 National Hurling League was the 49th season of the National Hurling League (NHL), an annual hurling competition for the GAA county teams.

Overview

Structure

The National Hurling League's top division was divided into two groups - 1A and 1B. The top two teams in Division 1A advance to the semi-finals. The third- and fourth-placed teams in 1A, as well as the top two from 1B, play in the quarter-finals. The bottom two teams in 1A are relegated, while the top two teams in 1B are promoted. The bottom team in 1B is relegated, while the Division 2 champions are promoted.

Overview

Division 1

The National Hurling League's top division featured fourteen teams divided into two equal groups - 1A and 1B. Each group consisted of seven teams.  The top two teams from Division 1A automatically qualified for the knock-out semi-finals. The third and fourth placed teams, as well as the top two teams from Division 1B, contested two lone quarter-finals. In spite of losing two group games and finishing second in Division 1A, Cork won the league title following a 4-15 to 4-6 defeat of Limerick in a replay of the final.

Down at the other end of the tables, Kilkenny and Clare won just two of their group stage games and were both relegated to Division 1B.  They swapped places with Wexford and Waterford who finished in first and second positions respectively in Division 1B. Kildare finished the group stage without a single win and were relegated to Division 2.

Division 1

Tipperary came into the season as defending champions of the 1978-79 season. Kerry entered Division 1 as the promoted team.

On 10 May 1980, Cork won the title after a 4-15 to 4-6 win over Limerick in the final. It was their 11th league title overall and their first since 1973-74.

Kildare were relegated from Division 1 after losing all of their group stage games.

Division 1A table

Group stage

Division 1B table

Group stage

Play-off

Knock-out stage

Quarter-finals

Semi-finals

Finals

Division 2

Knock-out stage

Division 3

Knock-out stage

External links
 1980 National Hurling League results

References

National Hurling League seasons
League
League